Francis de Witt Batty (known as De Witt; 10 January 1879 – 3 April 1961) was the 7th Anglican Bishop of Newcastle in Australia from 1931 until his retirement in 1958.

Early life
De Witt Batty was born in 1879, the son of the Rev William Edmund Batty and his wife Frances Beatrice, née Jebb. He was named after his mother's ancestor, the Dutch patriot Johan de Witt. He was educated at St Paul's School, London and Balliol College, Oxford

Clerical career
Batty trained for ordination at Wells Theological College, and was ordained deacon in 1903 and priest in 1904. His first position was as a curate at Hornsey where he was asked a year later by the outgoing rector, St Clair Donaldson, to accompany him as his chaplain when Donaldson was appointed Archbishop of Brisbane. From 1909 to 1916 he edited the Brisbane Church Chronicle. In 1915 he was appointed a residential canon at St John's Cathedral, Brisbane and in 1925 the cathedral's dean. He was consecrated a bishop on 25 January 1930 by Gerald Sharp, Archbishop of Brisbane, to serve as coadjutor bishop of Brisbane. He once called his see "the most enviable diocese in Australia".

Batty retired to Double Bay, Sydney, and died on 3 April 1961. He was cremated and his ashes interred with William Tyrrell at St John's Anglican Cemetery, Morpeth. In his obituary in The Times, he was described as being "one of the most outstanding Englishmen ever to dedicate his life to public service in Australia".

References

1879 births
1961 deaths
People educated at St Paul's School, London
Alumni of Balliol College, Oxford
Alumni of Wells Theological College
Assistant bishops in the Anglican Diocese of Brisbane
Deans of Brisbane
Anglican bishops of Newcastle (Australia)